The Macau Amateur Radio Society (ARM;) is a non-profit organization for amateur radio enthusiasts in Macau, China. ARM was established during Portuguese Macau. The organization's primary mission is to popularize and promote amateur radio in Macau and to serve the community of the Special Administrative Region.  One membership benefit of the organization is a QSL bureau for members who regularly make communications with amateur radio operators in other countries.  ARM is the member society representing Macau in the International Amateur Radio Union.

See also 
Chinese Radio Amateurs Club
Amateur radio licensing in China
Chinese Radio Sports Association
Chinese Taipei Amateur Radio League
Hong Kong Amateur Radio Transmitting Society

References 

Macau
Organisations based in Macau
Radio in Macau